Absolute Radio 10s is a spin-off service from Absolute Radio. The station is a rolling music service which airs music from the period 2010–2019. It launched at 10.00am on 18 November 2019. It is the sixth decades themed station to be launched by Absolute's parent company, Bauer Radio, but unlike most of its sister stations, it launched exclusively online at launch.

Following an announcement that the service was to be made available in the DAB+ format in the London area from May 2021, Absolute Radio 10s began broadcasting in DAB+ on the CE London digital multiplex (co-owned by Bauer and Global) on 26 April 2021; at the same time the London feed of Absolute Radio was removed from CE (in preparation for the switch of the 105.8 FM frequency it relayed to Greatest Hits Radio in May).

References

External links

Absolute Radio
Radio stations established in 2019
2019 establishments in the United Kingdom
2010s-themed radio stations
Bauer Radio